Yogendra Premkrishna Trivedi is a member of the Nationalist Congress Party of India. He is also a member of the board of directors of Reliance Industries.

He is a Member of the Parliament of India representing Maharashtra in the Rajya Sabha, the upper house of the Parliament. He graduated with a B.Com., after which he did LL.B. Currently, he lives in Delhi. He has travelled extensively throughout the world. He was the president of Cricket Club of India and currently is a member. He is an eminent lawyer of the Supreme Court of India. He is also the chairman of JK Sports foundation. His term is 2 April 2008 to 2 April 2014.

He was born and brought up in Surat.

References

External links

Living people
Marathi politicians
1929 births
Nationalist Congress Party politicians from Maharashtra
Rajya Sabha members from Maharashtra
People from Surat